Lancelot William McCaskill  (8 May 1900 – 9 August 1985) was a New Zealand agricultural instructor, lecturer, conservationist and writer. Born in Winchester, South Canterbury, New Zealand, he became aware of soil erosion problems in 1929 through his work towards his master's thesis Fertilizers in New Zealand, 1867–1929. He argued in favour of land management and conservation over downstream engineering solutions. His long career of public advocacy for soil conservation made him a pioneer of environmentalism, as it is understood today.

In the 1969 New Year Honours, McCaskill was appointed a Commander of the Order of the British Empire, for services to agriculture and soil conservation. He was awarded an honorary DSc by the University of Canterbury in 1978.

McCaskill died in Christchurch on 9 August 1985.

References

1900 births
1985 deaths
New Zealand educators
New Zealand writers
New Zealand conservationists
Academic staff of the Lincoln University (New Zealand)
New Zealand Commanders of the Order of the British Empire